Guichenotia is a genus of about 16 species of flowering plants that are endemic to the south west of Western Australia.

The genus was first formally described in 1821 by Jaques Étienne Gay in Mémoires du Muséum d'Histoire Naturelle. The first species Gay described was Guichenotia ledifolia. The genus name honours Antoine Guichenot, gardener's boy on the 1801–1803 French scientific voyage to Australia under Nicolas Baudin.

Species list
The following species of Guichenotia are accepted by the Australian Plant Census as at 22 March 2022:
Guichenotia alba Keighery 
Guichenotia angustifolia (Turcz.) Druce
Guichenotia anota C.F.Wilkins 
Guichenotia apetala A.S.George 
Guichenotia asteriskos C.F.Wilkins 
Guichenotia astropletha C.F.Wilkins 
Guichenotia basiviridis C.F.Wilkins 
Guichenotia glandulosa C.F.Wilkins 
Guichenotia impudica C.F.Wilkins 
Guichenotia intermedia C.F.Wilkins 
Guichenotia ledifolia J.Gay 
Guichenotia macrantha Turcz. - large-flowered guichenotia
Guichenotia micrantha (Steetz) Benth. - small-flowered guichenotia
Guichenotia quasicalva C.F.Wilkins 
Guichenotia sarotes Benth. 
Guichenotia seorsiflora C.F.Wilkins 
Guichenotia tuberculata C.F.Wilkins

References

FloraBase - the Western Australian flora: Guichenotia 

Byttnerioideae
Rosids of Western Australia
Malvales of Australia
Malvaceae genera